Arctinus of Miletus or Arctinus Milesius was a Greek epic poet whose reputation is purely legendary, as none of his works survive. Traditionally dated between 775 BC and 741 BC, he was said to have been a pupil of Homer. His father was Teleus son of Nauteus.
Phaenias of Eresus placed him in the 7th century BC and claimed that he was defeated by Lesches of Pyrrha in competition. One of the "cyclic poets", Arctinus composed the epics Aethiopis and Sack of Troy, which were contributions to the Trojan War cycle, and possibly Naupactia.

These poems are lost, but an idea of the first two can be obtained from the Chrestomathy ascribed (probably wrongly) to Proclus the Neo-Platonist of the 5th century AD.

The Aethiopis (Αἰθιοπίς), in five books, is so called from the Aethiopian Memnon, who became the ally of the Trojans after the death of Hector. According to Proclus, the poem took up the narrative from the close of the Iliad:

"The Amazon Penthesilea arrives to aid the Trojans in war. She is the daughter of Ares and a Thracian by birth. Achilles kills her while she is fighting at her best, and the Trojans bury her. Achilles kills Thersites, who railed at him and reproached him for loving Penthesileia.”

The Aethiopis  concluded with the death and burial of Achilles and the dispute between Ajax and Odysseus for his arms.

The Sack of Troy (Iliou Persis) told the stories of the Trojan Horse, Sinon, and Laocoön, the capture of the city, and the departure of the Greeks pursued by the anger of Athena at the rape of Cassandra by Ajax the Lesser. The Little Iliad, usually ascribed to Lesches, bridged the gap in the story-line between Aethiopis and the Sack of Troy.

References

Sources 
Eusebius, Chronicle Olympiad 1.2, 5.1.
Clement of Alexandria, Stromata 1.131.6.
Suda s.lem. Arctinus (Alpha, 3960:  Ἀρκτῖνος).

Further reading 
 David Binning Monro,  "On the Fragment of Proclus' Abstract of the Epic Cycle Contained in the Codex Venetus of the Iliad", Journal of Hellenic Studies, 4 (1883), 305-334.
 T.W. Allen in Classical Quarterly, April 1908, pp. 82ff.

Ancient Milesians
Early Greek epic poets
8th-century BC Greek people
8th-century BC poets